Viburnum acerifolium, the mapleleaf viburnum, maple-leaved arrowwood or dockmackie, is a species of Viburnum, native to eastern North America from southwestern Quebec and Ontario south to northern Florida and eastern Texas. It is adapted for USDA hardiness zones of 4 to 8.

Description
There is a diverse manifestation of autumn color with this species from pale yellow to bright yellow to orange or pink, rose, or red-purple depending on the light exposure and weather conditions. The flowers are white with five small petals, produced in terminal cymes  diameter. The fruit is a small red to purple-black drupe 4–8 mm (about 1/3") long. It attracts butterflies and birds. Viburnum acerifolium is a larval host to the Celastrina ladon butterfly. It grows in and around upland forest, able to do well in full shade and dry soils. It grows mostly in acid soil of pH 5.0 to 6.5, but can tolerate up to 7.5. The shrub often suckers and can form a colony in time.

Distribution
Viburnum acerifolium is found in such US states as Connecticut, Maine, Massachusetts, New Hampshire, Rhode Island  New York and Vermont as well as Illinois, Wisconsin, Florida, Arkansas and Texas.

Habitat
Landscape architects and designers have often recommended it for shady, dry locations for several decades, but it is only sold at a few very large, diverse nurseries or specialty or native plant nurseries and is not generally well known in the trade or with homeowners. Its native habitats include thickets, mixed woods, bluffs, and ravines.

Ecology
The species' flowers are known for production of nectar and pollen which are then carried by the bee species from Andrenidae and Halictidae families as well as flies from the Empididae and Syrphidae families. The flowers also attract beetles, wasps and various butterflies (including skippers).

The berries are eaten by various mammals including skunks, rabbits, deer, the eastern chipmunk, white-footed mouse and deer mice. C. acerifolium also attracts various aphids, such as Viburnum leaf beetle, the wood-boring larvae of Oberea deficiens and Oberea tripunctata.

The scientific and common names refer to the superficial similarity of the leaves to those of some maples (Acer); the plant is occasionally mistaken for young maples, but is readily distinguished by the flowers and fruit; the viburnum produces small, purple berries, while maples produce dry, winged seeds.

Uses
The black berries, available from late summer to autumn, can be made into jam.

References

Bioimages: Viburnum acerifolium

acerifolium
Flora of Eastern Canada
Flora of the Eastern United States
Flora of the Appalachian Mountains
Flora of the Great Lakes region (North America)
Flora of the Southeastern United States
Plants described in 1753
Taxa named by Carl Linnaeus
Least concern flora of the United States